The Incredulity of Saint Thomas is a 1543–1547 painting by Francesco Salviati. It was commissioned for the église Notre-Dame-de-Confort in Lyon by Thomas II de Gadagne (also known as Tomaso Guadagni), a Florentine counselor to Francis I of France. It is now held in the Louvre Museum and measures 275 cm by 234 cm. It is signed FRANCESCO SALVIATO FLO. OPUS (S.B.D.) and the apostle shown in three-quarter-profile is a self-portrait of Salviati.

Its choice of subject reflects an anti-Medici political viewpoint shared by commissioner and artist. The work proved popular from its arrival in Lyon onwards and was copied by several artists in several media, including an engraving by Master CC. Even after art history began to neglect art produced in and for Lyon, the painting was one of few such works still to be mentioned - for example, it appears in Giorgio Vasari's Lives.

References

Bibliography 

 
 
 

1547 paintings
Paintings depicting Jesus
Paintings about death
Christian art about death
Paintings depicting Thomas the Apostle
Paintings in the Louvre by Italian artists